The Ecclesiastical Jurisdiction Act 1661 (13 Cha 2 St. 1 c. 12) was an Act of the Parliament of England.

The whole Chapter, except section 4, was repealed by section 87 of, and Schedule 5 to, the Ecclesiastical Jurisdiction Measure 1963 (No 1).

The whole Act, so far as unrepealed, was repealed by section 1 of, and Part II of the Schedule to, the Statute Law (Repeals) Act 1969.

Content

Reuse

Section 2
This section, from "be it" to "aforesaid that" was repealed by section 1 of, and Part I of the Schedule to, the Statute Law Revision Act 1888.

Section 3
This section, from "and it is" to "enacted" was repealed by section 1 of, and Part I of the Schedule to, the Statute Law Revision Act 1888.

Section 4
This section, from "and it is" to "enacted" was repealed by section 1 of, and Part I of the Schedule to, the Statute Law Revision Act 1888.

References
Halsbury's Statutes,

Acts of the Parliament of England
1661 in law
1661 in England